Brasey is a surname. Notable people with the surname include:

Édouard Brasey (born 1954), French writer
Patrice Brasey (born 1964), Swiss ice hockey player

See also
Brasel